Fantasy Springs is an upcoming theme-land at Tokyo DisneySea similar to Fantasyland. The expansion is set to open in Spring 2024.

History
In 2015, Tokyo DisneySea announced the addition of a new "Scandinavia" port based on the 3D computer-animated musical film Frozen. However, this plan would be shelved in favor of Tokyo Disneyland's Fantasyland expansion and the Frozen plans would be repurposed for a larger expansion project.

On June 14, 2018, Tokyo Disney Resort announced the new port will include sections about the films Tangled and Peter Pan, World of Frozen will be as part of the new port. A new hotel will be built nearby.

In October 2022, due to the extension of the project's construction period, which was impacted by delay in productions overseas, as well as restrictions placed on logistics and border measures to prevent the spread of COVID-19, it was announced that opening date would be delayed to Spring 2024. It was also announced that each area would be called Frozen Kingdom, Rapunzel's Forest and Peter Pan's Never Land respectively. There will also be a Disney hotel, Tokyo DisneySea Fantasy Springs Hotel, in this new port.

Areas

Frozen Kingdom

Rapunzel's Forest

Attraction
Tangled: The Ride

Restaurant
Tangled Tree Tavern

Peter Pan's Never Land

Attractions
Neverland Adventure
Pixie Hollow

Restaurant
Lost Boys' Hideout

References

 
Tokyo DisneySea
Themed areas in Walt Disney Parks and Resorts